The L&YR Class 2 was a class of 4-4-0 steam locomotives of the Lancashire and Yorkshire Railway. It was designed by William Barton Wright and introduced in 1885.

Construction
Thirty-six locomotives were built and 2 passed to the London, Midland and Scottish Railway at the grouping in 1923.

Numbering
Full details not currently available. The two which passed to the LMS were:

Withdrawal
Withdrawals began in 1906 and the last locomotive was withdrawn and scrapped in 1930. None have been preserved.

References

4-4-0 locomotives
02
Railway locomotives introduced in 1885